The 2013 Giro di Lombardia or 2013 Il Lombardia was the 107th edition of the Giro di Lombardia single-day cycling race, often known as the Race of the Falling Leaves. It was held on 6 October 2013. Joaquim Rodríguez won the race for a consecutive time after a solo breakaway initiated on the final climb of the day. Alejandro Valverde finished second before Rafał Majka.

Results

References

2013 UCI World Tour
2013 Giro di Lombardia
2013 in Italian sport